Khemara or Khemara- (UNGEGN: ,; , UNGEGN: ,) is the formal term for Khmer in the Khmer language. It is used as a personal name as well as organization names. It is also written as Khemarak (UNGEGN: ,) and different suffixes.

Institutions and organizations

Khemara Keila FC, a football club based in Phnom Penh, Cambodia
Khemara (NGO)
Khemarak University, a university in Kampong Speu Province, Cambodia
Royal Cambodian Armed Forces
Cambodian Scouts

Places
Khemarin Palace, one of the palaces in the Royal Palace of Cambodia’s complex
Khemarat District, a district in Ubon Ratchathani Province, Thailand

See also
Khmer (disambiguation)